Woodstock is a -story historic home located at Upper Marlboro, Prince George's County, Maryland, United States. The home is an outstanding example of a mid-19th-century plantation house with decorative elements in the Greek Revival style. The main block was probably built in the early 1850s by Washington Custis Calvert. The home is in the Tidewater house style.

Woodstock was listed on the National Register of Historic Places in 1987.

References

External links 

 , including photo in 1986, at Maryland Historical Trust website
 Woodstock, 8706 South East Crain Highway (U.S. Route 301), Upper Marlboro vicinity, Prince George's County, MD: 15 photos and 14 data pages, at Historic American Buildings Survey

Historic American Buildings Survey in Maryland
Houses completed in the 19th century
Houses in Prince George's County, Maryland
Houses on the National Register of Historic Places in Maryland
Calvert family residences
Plantation houses in Maryland
National Register of Historic Places in Prince George's County, Maryland